Utah State Route 215 may refer to:

 Utah State Route 215, the legislative overlay designation for Interstate (I-215) within Utah, United States. By Utah State law, I-215 within the state has been defined as "State Route 215" since 1977).
 Utah State Route 215 (1957-1959), a former state highway in eastern Tooele County, Utah that ran from Dugway Proving Ground easterly to SR-36 in St. John (now the town of Rush Valley)
 Utah State Route 215 (1941-1953), a former state highway in southeastern Box Elder County, Utah, United States that ran west from SR-1 in Perry for

See also
 List of state highways in Utah
 List of Interstate Highways in Utah
 List of highways numbered 215